JAM8 is a  founded by Indian music composer/director Pritam. The platform provides facilities up and coming musicians. Pritam and his team supervise the young talent and some artists become part of Pritam's musical projects.

History

On 9 April 2016, music composer and director Pritam announced JAM8 on Twitter. He wrote: "Just announced J.A.M 8 (Just About Music) with Kaushik-Akash, who are the first artists of my A&R Music Production platform."

Their first work in mainstream Indian music was the 1920 London soundtrack, which released in 2016. They were one of the composers for the soundtrack of the film Raees in 2017. Their composition "Zaalima" was a huge hit from this album. They continued their works in Bollywood composing for the films like Behen Hogi Teri, Raabta, Shaadi Mein Zaroor Aana, Race 3, Loveratri and recent films like 14 Phere and Helmet. They also worked in Telugu film Touch Chesi Chudu and Bengali films like Crisscross, Villain.

In June 2022, they launched their first non-soundtrack album under the name "Raposo JamRoom" by collaborating with 19 Indian background singers and 12 selected composers mentored by Pritam under Sony Music India label.

Discography

Soundtracks

Hindi Soundtracks

Non-Hindi Soundtracks

Hindi Music Video

Hindi Non-Film Soundtracks

Overview
During the launch, Pritam said, “I had this plan long back, but could not execute it as I had no time and no one to manage it. Now, there is a team to do so, and I have some time to mentor them as I have limited assignments.”

“JAM8 is a platform for newcomer composers. We hunt for them from all corners and want to push their music into the mainstream, as the industry is open to multiple composers for a film now.”
|}

Accolades

References

Indian music websites
Music companies of India